"Repeat After Me" is a song by Canadian country music group Family Brown. The song was released as a single in February 1984 and is the second single from their ninth studio album Repeat After Me. The single peaked at number five on the Canadian RPM Country Tracks chart in May 1984.

"Repeat After Me" received two nominations at the 1984 Canadian Country Music Association Awards for Single of the Year and Song of the Year. The song lost to Anne Murray's "A Little Good News" and Dick Damron's "Jesus, It's Me Again", respectively.

Chart performance

References

1984 singles
Family Brown songs
RCA Records singles
Songs written by Barry Brown (Canadian musician)
Song recordings produced by Tony Brown (record producer)
Song recordings produced by Norro Wilson
1984 songs